Olga Yurevna Vasilieva (sometimes transliterated as Vasilyeva, ; born 13 January 1960 in Bugulma) is a Russian politician and historian, who served in Vladimir Putin's government as Minister of Education and Science (2016—2018), and as Minister of Education from May 2018 to January 2020. She is known for defending Soviet policies and for making controversial statements that were perceived as supportive of Joseph Stalin.

Early years 
Vasilieva was born in 1960 in Bugulma.

In 1979 she graduated with a degree in Choir and Conducting from Moscow State Institute of Culture. Later in the mid-1980s she studied history at Moscow State University for Humanities. For several years she was a singing-master and a history teacher.

Afterwards she switched to research work as a historian. In 1987 she was admitted to the Ph.D. program in the Institute of History of the USSR Academy of Sciences.

In 1990 she defended her Ph.D. dissertation The Soviet State and Patriotic Activities of the Russian Orthodox Church during the Years of the Great Patriotic War.

From 1991 to 2002 Vasilyeva worked at the Russian Academy of Sciences.

Civil servant 
In 2007 Vasilieva finished a study at the Diplomatic Academy of the Ministry of Foreign Affairs of the Russian Federation. Her career as a person in the state service began in the Department for Culture of the Russian Government. She was responsible, among other items, for primary and secondary school programs, particularly in Russian history and in Russian religious education.

Prior to her ministerial appointment, Vasilieva was a department head at RANEPA, where she worked since 2002.

As politician 
On 19 August 2016 she was appointed a Minister of Education and Science of the Russian Federation in the First Medvedev cabinet. Her Ministry was divided in May 2018 into the Ministry of Education (also called the Ministry of General Education) and the Ministry of Science and Higher Education. On 18 May 2018, Vasilieva became a Minister of Education of the Russian Federation.

Her appointing was interpreted as a favour to the patriotic and minoritarian part of the governing elite, due to the fact that Vasileva was a conservative and a patriarchate-friendly loyalist. She accused her predecessor Dmitry Livanov to be an "apolitical and liberal-minded technocrat who did too little to promote values such as love for the Motherland".

On 15 January 2020, she was part of the cabinet resignation after President Vladimir Putin delivered the Presidential Address to the Federal Assembly, in which he proposed several amendments to the constitution.

After politics
On 30 June 2021 Vasilyeva was elected President of the Russian Academy of Education.

Vasilieva was rumoured to have a conflictual relationship with Marina Rakova during their tenure in the administration of Vladimir Putin. Their conflict is said to be the reason of a high-profile 'Rakova case', resulted in the arrest of rectors Sergey Zuev and Vladimir Mau.

Publications 
She has written over 160 articles and 8 books.

References

External links 

Biography: Vasilyeva Olga. // An official website of the Ministry of Education and Science of the Russian Federation.

1960 births
Living people
20th-century Russian historians
21st-century Russian politicians
Education ministers of Russia
21st-century Russian women politicians
Women government ministers of Russia
Women historians